Seoul is the capital and largest city of South Korea.

Seoul may also refer to:

Seoul Capital Area, the metropolitan area of Seoul
FC Seoul, a South Korean professional football club
Seoul Street, a street in Tehran, Iran

Songs
"Seoul" (song), by Amiina, 2006
"Seoul", by Girls' Generation and Super Junior, 2009
"Seoul", by Lee Hyori from Black, 2017
"Seoul", by RM from Mono, 2018

See also

Seul (disambiguation)